Motorola was an American multinational telecommunications company which split in 2011.

Motorola may also refer to:
 Motorola Mobility, mobile phone manufacturer
 Motorola Solutions, equipment provider
 Arsen Pavlov (1983–2016), known by his nom de guerre Motorola, pro-Russian separatist of the Donbass War
 Binatone, electronics manufacturer using the brand name Motorola
 "Motorola", a 2018 song by Gorgon City
 "Motorola", a 2019 song by Da Beatfreakz, Swarmz, Deno and Dappy